Herbert Jack Banta (November 19, 1917 – February 22, 1977) was an American football halfback in the National Football League (NFL) for the Philadelphia Eagles, the Washington Redskins and Los Angeles Rams. He played college football at the University of Southern California for Howard Jones and was drafted in the tenth round of the 1941 NFL Draft. He served as a Lieutenant (junior grade) in the Navy during the World War II era.

References

External links

1917 births
1977 deaths
American football running backs
Los Angeles Rams players
Philadelphia Eagles players
Players of American football from Los Angeles
USC Trojans football players
Washington Redskins players
United States Navy officers